Random Movement is the stage name of DJ and drum and bass musician Michael Richards. As a recording artist, he has many releases on Innerground Records, Fokuz Recordings, V Recordings, and his own label, Flight Pattern.

Biography 

In 2003, Richards and Jack Sheets (aka "Mister Shifter") founded Random Movement. Jack Sheets later left in 2006.

Discography

Albums 

2009: Lucky Guess (Innerground Records)

EPs 
2008: Her Song EP (Innerground Records)
2011: Back In My Life EP (Driven AM Recordings)
2012: The Note From Next Door EP (Phuzion Digital)
2015: Sleazy Bitch EP (Fokuz Recordings)
2015: Meat Sauce EP (Fokuz Recordings)
2015: Ruffled Feathers EP w/ MixMaster Doc (Fokuz Recordings)
2015: God Complex EP (Innerground Records)
2016: Suggestions EP (Fokuz Recordings)
2017: Life Is Permanent EP (Flight Pattern Records)
2017: Hit The Ground Running EP w/ Jaybee (Flight Pattern Records)

Singles 

{|class=wikitable
|-
!Year
!Release
!Label
|-
| style="text-align:center;" rowspan="3"|2005
| Stars In The Dark / Struggle To The Grave
| Bassbin 
|-
| Love Nights / Red
| Innerground Records
|-
| What A Woman / Lifegiver 
| Orgone Recordings
|-
| style="text-align:center;" rowspan="5"|2006
| Scarlet Trouble / Methods Of Thought (with Focus)
| Bingo Beats
|-
| Time To Rock / Morning Glory
| Bassbin
|-
| Infinite / They Locked Me Down
| Progress
|-
| Stare At The Sun / Last Nights Dream
| Timeless Recordings
|-
| Intersections PM / Wise Words (with Kubiks & Lomax)
| Progress LTD
|-
| style="text-align:center;" rowspan="2"|2007
| Reaching Deeper / Face To Face
| Creative Source
|-
| Thick Liquid / Sabina
| Innerground Records
|-
| style="text-align:center;" rowspan="3"|2008
| Groove Thing / How Many Ways
| Future Retro
|-
| Believe No Other / The Student
| Westbay International
|-
| Till' Doomsday / Lesson & Aftermath
| C.I.A. Deep Kut
|-
| style="text-align:center;" rowspan="3"|2009
| Scotch Bonnet / P Style (with Squash)
| Intrigue Music
|-
| Rattled System / Big Changes
| Integral Records
|-
| Flag Man / Ain't Going Nowhere (with BCee)
| Future Retro
|-
| style="text-align:center;" rowspan="2"|2010
| Lucky Guess Album Sampler Part 1
| rowspan="2"|Innerground Records
|-
| Lucky Guess Album Sampler Part 2
|-
| style="text-align:center;" rowspan="4"|2011
| Many Things / Perpetual (with Ben Soundscape)
| Intrigue Music
|-
| Risk / Easy On The Motion (with Mutt & Calculon feat. Kevin King)
| Rubik Records
|-
| Risk VIP / Heard It In My Head
| Rubik Digital
|-
| 2 Dogs Down / Follow My Own Path Dig My Own Grave
| Influence Records
|-
| style="text-align:center;" rowspan="2"|2012
| Essential Forms (Klute Remix) / Same Ol' Me (with Mute & Mako, Jaybee)
| Mars Recordings
|-
| Feelings Translated / Dirt Dobber| Innerground Records
|-
| style="text-align:center;" rowspan="3"|2013
| Sounds Of The Innerground Part 2 (with DIalogue)
| Innerground Records
|-
| Corrupt Level / Alone This Way (No Need To Stay)| Good Looking Records
|-
| Dancing Feat / I'm Nobody's Fool| Rubik Records
|-
| style="text-align:center;" rowspan="2"|2014
| Ahead Of It All / When The Daylight Comes| V Records
|-
| Dancing Feat (Remixes)| Rubik Records
|-
| 2015
| Girl / Future Blues| Occulti Music
|-
| style="text-align:center;" rowspan="5"|2016
|Saturated Fats (with Mixmaster Doc)
| Peer Pressure
|-
|Same Old Feelings| Intrigue Records
|-
| You Got Somethin' / Future Fondler| Flight Pattern
|-
| I Stayed Around (Lenzman Reinterpretation) / Meet You There| Fokuz Recordings
|-
| Nobody's Business (If I Do)| Prestige Music
|-
| 2017
| Life Is Permanent| Flight Pattern
|}

 Remixes 

2008: Peyo & Cloud Nine – That's What You Do to Me2009: DJ Marky & Makoto – Secret Place2010: Dan Marshall – Smoke And Mirrors2013: Technicolour & Komatic feat. Jayma – Vermillion2013: XRS & MC Fats – Lovin2013: Makoto – Girl I'm Running Back 2 U2013: Dynamic & Command Strange – A Girl Like You2014: Kill Paris feat. Marty Rod – Silence Of Heartbreak2014: Vigorous – Pain & Sorrow2014: DJ Chap – Let Me Love You2014: Clart & Kalum – Musical Paradise2015: Simplification – Love Forever2015: Lurch – Confessions 
2015: Blockwork – Morning Music2015: Rowpieces – Super Soul2015: Vandera feat. Lickz – Ring The Alarm2015: Broken Drums – Smile2015: Malaky & Skeletone & Satl – Future Blues2015: Dub FX – Run2016: Oktiv & AudioSketch – Come For Me2016: Surplus – Do It2016: Bachelors Of Science – On The Line2016: DJ Chap – Let Me Love You2016: Akuratyde – Still Perfect''

External links 
 Artist website
 Random Movement on SoundCloud
 Random Movement on Discogs

American drum and bass musical groups
Electronic music groups from Florida